Dému is a commune in the Gers department in southwestern France.

Geography

Population

Literature
Dému features as a main setting in the Michael Ondaatje novel Divisadero.

See also
Communes of the Gers department

References

Communes of Gers